In typography, any stroke which does not terminate in a serif is a terminal. By definition all sans-serif typefaces have terminals, and serif typefaces often have them as well. Spurs, ears, and swatches are all terminals, and hooks often end in terminals.

Types
Terminals come in many types, including:
finial
ball
beak
teardrop

Typography